Hayami Seiji was a Japanese politician during the Taishō era.

Career
Hayami was Parliamentary Vice-Minister for Finance. In August 1925, he replaced Okazaki Kunisuke as Minister of Agriculture and Forestry in Katō Takaaki's second cabinet. He left the post in January 1926, after Katō's death.

References

Japanese politicians
Ministers of Agriculture, Forestry and Fisheries of Japan
Ministers of Finance of Japan